A stain is an unwanted localized discoloration, often in fabrics or textiles.

Stain(s) or The Stain(s) may also refer to:

Color
 Stain (heraldry), a non-standard tincture
 Staining, in biology, a technique used to highlight contrast in samples
 Wood stain, a type of paint used to color wood

Arts and entertainment

Music
 Stains (Los Angeles band), a hardcore punk band formed in 1976
 The Stains (Maine), an early-1980s punk band
 MDC (band), originally The Stains, an Austin, Texas, punk band formed in 1979
 Stain (album), by Living Colour, 1993
 Stain (EP), by Mystery Machine, 1992
 "Stain", a song by Nirvana from Blew, 1989
 "Stains", a song by Future from the Superfly film soundtrack, 2018

Other media
 Stain (film), a 2021 Ugandan drama film 
 The Stain (film), a 1914 American silent drama film
 The Stain (novel), a 1984 novel by Rikki Ducornet
 Stain (My Hero Academia), a character in the manga series My Hero Academia
 S.T.A.I.N, a fictional crime organization in the video game Mystery Case Files: Huntsville
 The Stains, a fictional band in the 1981 film Ladies and Gentlemen, The Fabulous Stains

Places
 Stains, Seine-Saint-Denis, a commune in the northern suburbs of Paris, France

See also
 
 
 Bloodstain (disambiguation)
 Staines-upon-Thames, a town in Surrey, England